The RPG-28 Klyukva ("Cranberry") is a Russian handheld anti-tank rocket launcher.

History
The RPG-28 was unveiled in 2007 at IDEX Abu Dhabi by the State Research and Production Enterprise, Bazalt as a modern anti-tank rocket  launcher designed to defeat modern and future tanks with advanced reactive and composite armour as well as fortified infantry. It was offered for export in 2008. Officially adopted by the Russian Government in December 2011.

2022 Russian Invasion Of Ukraine
The RPG-28 has been used by the Russian military during the 2022 Russian invasion of Ukraine.

Description
The RPG-28 shares a close resemblance with the RPG-27 in that it is a portable, disposable anti-tank rocket launcher with a single shot capacity. The RPG-28 has a larger diameter round than the RPG-27 which enables the RPG-28 to achieve higher armour penetration performance. The RPG-28 round is a 125 mm tandem shaped charge with a weight of 8.5 kg and a range of 300 meters. The round has a stated penetration capability in excess of 1000 mm RHA (after ERA) and 3000 mm of brick. Loaded weight is 13.5 kg.

Users

 - a few captured.

References

External links
 Bazalt Brochure RPG-28
 Modern Firearms

Anti-tank rockets
Modern anti-tank rockets of Russia
Bazalt products
Military equipment introduced in the 2010s